Rockaway Creek is a small creek, in the Rockaway Beach neighborhood of Pacifica, California.  Located just south of Calera Creek.

See also
List of watercourses in the San Francisco Bay Area

References

Rivers of San Mateo County, California
Pacifica, California
Rivers of Northern California